Fernando Caruncho is a Spanish Landscape designer. His minimalist garden designs make use of light and organic shapes.

Life

Caruncho studied philosophy at the Universidad Autónoma de Madrid from 1975, and then, from 1979, landscape design at the Castillo de Batres, a private landscaping school in Madrid.

Career

In 1979 Caruncho established his own studio. His first work accomplished at the age of 21, in a house in Madrid, published in VOGUE DECORATION in May 1987, Edited in Paris.

His second major publication was in July 1992 in that same magazine after two issues in which special attention is devoted to Jacques Wirtz and Russell Page, written by Jean-Paul Pigeat, Director General of Jardines de France and founder of the Festival des Jardins Chaumont-sur-Loire. He was invited to the first edition along with the great 10 Landscape designers at that moment, being Caruncho the youngest of all of them by far.

His career continues with a series of projects in Spain, country which rejoins the rich Spanish gardens tradition with great enthusiasm, gardens which essentially influenced him, such as the Alhambra, Patio de los Naranjos, or the Alcazar in Seville.

It is after 15 years of intense experience performing gardens when he had the opportunity to make his first project in the United States, although previously he worked in France and Italy, and continues his long career in which he is immersed today: Cotswolds in England, Marrakech in Morocco, Oakland in New Zealand, Tokyo in Japan...

His most recent projects are in Lugano, Switzerland; Isola Bella, a Project of an island in Maine, Fundación Botín working together with Renzo Piano in Santander, Spain; a Project next to the sea in Greece; and one at Vigneto de L’Amastuola in Apulia, Italy.

He is an honorary member of the Accademia delle Arti del Disegno of Florence, and a member of the Circulo Fortuny of the European Cultural and Creative Industries Alliance.

About his work

In Caruncho´s work, light is the key element of the garden. In addition to the light, the geometry and the relation of the garden and landscape architecture. When he speaks about geometry he always insists that it may be obvious or hidden, but it is without a doubt the way to read or interpret the place, and in his gardens there is a clear example of this.

Nowadays in his studio architecture projects are developed with a new concept: The architecture forms a whole unity with the garden.

Dan Kiley, master of American landscape design of the last 50 years, wrote the preface to the book Mirrors of Paradise by Guy Cooper and Gordon Taylor, a book that summaried the first 15 years of Caruncho´s work. Kiley recognises Caruncho as his successor, as he bases on his same principles and design ideals:

"My career is approaching its sunset, and in Caruncho I see someone who may well be the only landscape architect who is guided by the same principles and ideals that I have tried to realize over the course of my work. I have been hoping that my way of thinking, which is purely a method of recognizing and solving a problem and is not necessarily unique to me, would be projected, and I believe he is the ideal one to carry it forward."

Kiley also highlights the influence that religion has on Caruncho's work:
"Caruncho’s relation to religion is important. It is easy to see his correspondence of religion and environment, like falling over into something it’s obvious once you have the knowledge and the background. In his own words, "What is religion but our desire to know where, how, and why we stand in this world? And as I said in my own book, "The greatest contribution a designer can make is to link the human and the natural in such a way as to recall our fundamental place in the scheme of things."

According to Guy Cooper and Gordon Taylor"

"Ancient agriculture meets formal contemporary garden design in the late twentieth century. Caruncho is classically educated, as can be seen from any of his designs which combine profound simplicity with extraordinary sophistication. Caruncho says that his designs are a constant attempt "to capture the light (vibration lumineuse) "in the garden space, through a formal setting of the simplest elements: "everything in a Spanish garden is founded in how you deal with the light" "Caruncho sees the garden as a mirror of the universe: "I strive to arrange a space that invites reflection and inquiry by allowing the light to delineate geometries, perspectives and symmetries"

Kirsty Fergusson remarks Caruncho´s philosophical bases as a trigger of his curiosity in the relation between man and nature, and its application to the world of garden and the diverse influences if Zen, European Classicism on his work. Caruncho believed light "makes the languages of geometry intelligible".
 
Although most of Fernando Caruncho gardens are not open to the public, Paul Jean Piaget says they will leave a deep mark in the Mediterranean Garden scenery in the coming decades.
 
According to Jane Amidon Caruncho rearranges the elements of the garden to get an impression of modernity: "A classicist at first glance, landscape architect Fernando Caruncho takes traditional crops, harvest techniques and water-collection methods and rearranges then to find a modernist spatial sensibility."

Penelope Hobhouse has described his work as the antithesis to the English Jekyll Style Garden. His designs are implemented on a grid system which Hobhouse says "unites all the individual elements". She says Cauruncho "brings a basic purity to design, using straight lines and right angles on a large landscape scale, emphasizing light and shadow, movement, form, leaf colour, and texture, with little reference to flowers.'

Nancy Hass, in her article for T Magazine of The New York Times writes:

"At first glance, the hypnotic curves of Amastuola seem uncharacteristic of Caruncho. He is a master of the right angle, of near impossible planes and monochromatic environments…but the vineyard…combines an allegiance to straight lines with an organic impulse…visually you have the shock of the grid against the waves"
 
Tim Richardson says:

"His particular brand of formality runs deep; it is not a simple design tool but a fundamental belief, inspired by his philosophical studies notably of the ancient Greeks. The sense of order and balance, of permanence and history is archived by bringing together by Caruncho own aesthetic heritage and the history of the landscape.  He is particularly interested in the science of irrigation and ancient agricultural patterns."

Projects

Among the more than 150 projects, some of the most significant projects are:

 Mas de les Voltes, Ampurdán, Spain
 Casa Caruncho, Madrid, Spain
 Mas Floris, Ampurdán, Spain
 Flynn, Boca Ratón, Florida, USA
 Mavec-Nordberg, New Jersey, USA
 Isola Bella, Maine, USA
 Hauraki Gulf Garden, the North Island of New Zealand
 Embassy of Spain, Tokyo, Japan
 Garden of the Seven Mountains, Lugano, Switzerland
 Casa del Agua, Greece
 Jardines de Pereda, Fundación Botín, Santander, Spain.

References

Further reading 

 
 
 
 
 
 
 
 
 

Spanish landscape architects
Spanish designers
People from Madrid
Living people
Year of birth missing (living people)